Brommaplan (Bromma Square) is a roundabout  in the borough of Bromma  in  Stockholm, Sweden.

Description
Brommaplan is a local center and traffic hub in Bromma. It includes Brommaplan metro station and a  large bus terminal  offering connections to Drottningholm and Ekerö. 
It has six connecting streets and is situated at the  intersection of Drottningholmsvägen 400, Kvarnbacksvägen 135, Spångavägen 1 and Bergslagsvägen 1.

See also
Brommaplan metro station

References

Squares in Stockholm

de:Brommaplan (Stockholm Tunnelbana)
no:Brommaplan tunnelbanestasjon
pl:Brommaplan (stacja metra)